Girekol or Girekol Tepe is a  volcano in Van Province, Turkey. It is an alkaline shield volcano and the most recent activity has been dated to 0.36 +/- 0.06 Ma.

The volcano has produced plagiophyric, trachybasaltic lavas that are among the youngest eruption activities on the northern coast of Lake Van. In part, these overlie older volcanic products.

References

Volcanoes of Turkey
Mountains of Turkey
Two-thousanders of Turkey
Pleistocene shield volcanoes